The Golden Gift is a 1922 American silent drama film directed by Maxwell Karger and starring Alice Lake, John Bowers, and Harriet Hammond.

Plot
As described in a film magazine, Nita Gordon (Lake), a dancer in a Mexican cafe near the border, is befriended by an Italian man who expresses interest in her. She has been deserted by her husband and leaves her baby at a mission where it is adopted by a wealthy family. Five years later in New York City, after attaining success, she meets wealthy patron of the opera James Llewelyn (Bowers) and falls in love with him. He learns that Nita is the mother of the child he had adopted through a photograph that she gives him that contains some writing. Nita admits the truth and is happily reunited with her child.

Cast
 Alice Lake as Nita Gordon 
 John Bowers as James Llewelyn 
 Harriet Hammond as Edith Llewelyn 
 Josef Swickard as Leonati 
 Bridgetta Clark as Rosana 
 Louis Dumar as Malcolm Thorne 
 Geoffrey Webb as Stephen Brand 
 Camilla Clark as Joy Llewelyn

References

Bibliography
 Munden, Kenneth White. The American Film Institute Catalog of Motion Pictures Produced in the United States, Part 1. University of California Press, 1997.

External links

1922 films
1922 drama films
Silent American drama films
Films directed by Maxwell Karger
American silent feature films
1920s English-language films
Metro Pictures films
American black-and-white films
1920s American films